Sir Winston Churchill Secondary School is a public secondary school located in Vancouver, British Columbia. Churchill Secondary is one of three International Baccalaureate schools (along with Britannia Secondary School and King George Secondary School) and one of three French Immersion secondary schools in Vancouver. It is named after the former Prime Minister of the United Kingdom, Winston Churchill. Churchill has the largest student body population in district 39 with about 2000 students in the campus.

Churchill is fed by the surrounding elementary schools in its catchment area.  They include Sir Wilfrid Laurier Elementary School, Dr. Annie B. Jamieson Elementary School, Sir William Osler Elementary School, J.W. Sexsmith Elementary School, and David Lloyd George Elementary School.  Although not within Churchill's catchment area, L'École Bilingue, Kerrisdale Elementary School, L'École Quilchena and Sir James Douglas Elementary School feed into its French Immersion Program.

Special programs

IB programme
Churchill Secondary offers an International Baccalaureate Programme, which attracts many students from the school district to apply.   The school also offers the IB Certificate Programme, which allows students in the regular BC provincial curriculum to take part in IB courses. This option is only open when there is a vacancy in that particular class.  IB courses include English, French, Japanese, Mandarin (cancelled since the school year 2021-2022), Physics, Chemistry, Biology, Geography, History, Art, Psychology, Film Studies, Theatre, Mathematics, and Theory of Knowledge. French Immersion students entering the IB Programme may opt to take a more advanced French course (called French A, as opposed to French B for non-French Immersion students), allowing them to earn a BC French Dogwood Diploma and a bilingual IB diploma simultaneously, in addition to the standard BC Dogwood Diploma and IB diploma.

Information sessions are held each year for entry into the program which requires a written application, previous academic performance record, standardized testing (PSAT), and an interview for students not currently attending Churchill Secondary.

As part of Global Families, a project where IB students choose a developing country to educate others on, students host World Awareness Day in which they set up displays in downtown Vancouver to teach the public about their country of choice. Students can also get involved as a member of IB Council or as an IB Director.

In 2022, the IB program is planning to host a conference called What Do, a conference that motivates students to choose their career paths based on what they like to do.

The program prepares students for post-secondary studies, with the possibility of receiving post-secondary credit for transferable courses, and many of Churchill's IB graduates go on to study at the University of British Columbia.

Prelude programme

There is also an advanced academics programme for grade 10 students, with the name changed from 'Pre-IB' to 'Prelude' since 2016 due to it no longer being affiliated with the International Baccalaureate organization. Prelude is available for both French Immersion and English students currently attending Churchill Secondary. There is one class of French Immersion Prelude students and two classes of English Prelude students. The French Immersion students taking part in the Prelude program have their French Language and Literature, Sciences, Social Studies, and one additional class in French (sometimes called FICO, though the name often changes from year to year) as one group, with only the English classes shared with the non-French Immersion Prelude students. Other classes, such as electives and mathematics, are taken with the general school population. There will also be one new class of Spanish Prelude Students, starting in 2022.

Ideal Mini School

Ideal Mini School is a grade 8-12 mini school program with 129 students (2010).

Synergy programme
The Synergy programme is an advanced programme for students in grades 8 and 9 who have demonstrated academic excellence and wish to augment their learning through an enhanced curriculum. A portfolio and an entrance test are required for admission. The program aims to foster critical thinking as well as a sense of community.

French immersion
Secondary French immersion is for students continuing on from elementary French immersion. There are two types of French immersion programs in elementary school: regular "French immersion" and "late-immersion". "French immersion" refers to French immersion programs that begin at the kindergarten level, while "late-immersion" refers to French immersion programs that begin in the 2nd grade. Students can receive a Bilingual Graduation Certificate. Students in French immersion can also participate in the IB program and receive a bilingual IB diploma. Students participate yearly in a French speech arts competition and are categorized between anglophone and francophone.

Science fair
An annual school science fair is held at Churchill Secondary, and two hundred projects are chosen to represent the school at the Vancouver District Science Fair. Winners there move onto the Greater Vancouver Regional Science Fair, and then onto the Canada-Wide Science Fair.

Athletics
The school's mascot is a bulldog, as Sir Winston Churchill, for whom the school is named, has been compared to a bulldog in political cartoons since the 1940s.  It offers volleyball, boys soccer, field hockey, swimming, curling, writing, and cross country teams in the fall; basketball, girls ice hockey, and table tennis teams in the winter; and girls soccer, rugby, track & field, badminton, tennis, golf, girls softball, and ultimate teams in the springtime. Teams are divided by age group: Bantam (Grade 8), Juvenile (Grade 9), Junior (Grade 10), and Senior (Grades 11 & 12).

Basketball
The school has 8 competitive teams for boys and girls and offers a basketball course to further student's skills. Every year the school hosts the Bulldog Classic, a basketball tournament with schools participating from around the Greater Vancouver region. On March 16, 2014, the Senior Boys Basketball Team won the AAAA B.C. High School Boys Championship against Surrey's Holy Cross.

Field hockey
Churchill has a Senior A field hockey team, which practices on the school campus's upper field. In 2012, Churchill Senior A was almost undefeated in the regular season except for a 1-0 loss against Richmond's McMath. They also won the Vancouver city championship that year. along with the championships from 2015-2018. Churchill Senior A had consistently won a seed in the BC AAA Girls Field Hockey Provincials, however, in the 2013 season lost the seat to rivals Eric Hamber Griffins. In the recent years, Churchill has done well in provincials and placed 8th in 2018 then however slipping down to 13th place in 2019.

Swimming

Since 2015 the school has a swimming team that competes on a city level and takes part in the British Columbia provincial championship.

Badminton

Since 2019, the school has had a very solid badminton team. In 2019, they managed to achieve 9th place at the British Columbia provincial championship, just 2 places lower than their top record of 7th.

Churchill Esports Club

As of 2022, Churchill's esports team has attended three national and one international tournaments. The team won two national tournament titles and placed second in the international tournament despite being seeded last.

Extra-curricular activities
Sir Winston Churchill is a competitor in Reach for the Top, and has won the provincial championship in 2008, 2009, and 2010. Churchill students have participated in local science fairs.  Clubs at the school include supporting various advocacy groups and interests, including a debate team, such as the Free the Children, World Vision, UNICEF and Amnesty International clubs. The school also hosts several student-run publications including the Big Bang Science Journal, Newsfeed and Extended Essay. In 2010, Churchill had the most runners as a school in the Vancouver Sun Run with 721 participants. Churchill's student-run website SWC social hosts the Churchill's Got Talent music competition powered by online voting and filmed the school's lip dub video.

Sustainability
Churchill has several sustainability student groups, with Environmental Club and the Climate Strike Club being the most notable. The Youth 4 Tap Club succeeding in banning the sale of plastic water bottles on campus. There is also recycling and composting club. The school also offers an environmental stewardship course for tenth graders, which develops sustainability projects and tends to the school vegetable garden.

History 

In 1956 the secondary school was built as a homage to Winston Churchill

In the early 90s, the school experienced a surge in student enrollment. To accommodate the increase, portable classrooms were installed south of the main building. By the mid to late 90s, an extension to the school was built as a permanent replacement for the portable classrooms. The extension added two new science labs, several new classrooms and a third gym.

In 2020, an outdoor learning center was built east of the school.

Notable events 

 In 2015 a letter containing Churchill's signature was found onsite following a call to "unearth the Vancouver School Board's artistic and cultural possessions"

Notable alumni

Angela Chang (張韶涵), singer and actress in Taiwan
Shawn Dou (窦骁), Chinese actor notable for his performance in Under the Hawthorn Tree
Tyla Flexman, field hockey player
Mike Harcourt, former premier of British Columbia
Gregory Henriquez, architect
Kid Koala, turntablist
Brad Swaile, voice actor in the Gundam anime series
Eddie Peng (彭于晏), Taiwanese-Canadian actor, singer, and model.
John Shorthouse, Vancouver Canucks play-by-play announcer.
Nicholas Tse (謝霆鋒), Hong Kong-Canadian singer and actor (attended in grade 8 only)
Madeleine Arthur, actress.
Osric Chau, actor and martial artist
Ken Sim, current mayor of Vancouver

References

External links

Ideal Mini School

High schools in Vancouver
International Baccalaureate schools in British Columbia
Educational institutions established in 1956
1956 establishments in British Columbia